The New Democratic Party ran a full slate of 295 candidates in the 1988 federal election, and elected 43 members to become the third-largest party in parliament.  Many of the party's candidates have their own biography pages; information about others may be found here.

Newfoundland and Labrador
Bonavista—Trinity—Conception: Larry Welsh
Burin—St. George's: L. Joseph Edwards
Gander—Grand Falls: Bryan Blackmore
Humber—St. Barbe—Baie Verte: Marie Newhook
Labrador: Evelyn Riggs
St. John's East: Jack Harris
St. John's West: Alfred J. Sullivan

Nova Scotia
Annapolis Valley—Hants: Keith Collins
Cape Breton Highlands—Canso: Wilf Cude
Cape Breton—East Richmond: John Stevens
Cape Breton—The Sydneys: Ed MacLeod
Central Nova: Gloria Murphy
Cumberland—Colchester: Barbara Jack
Dartmouth: Marty Zelenietz
Halifax: Ray Larkin
Halifax West: Lois Wiseman
South Shore: Bill Zimmerman
South West Nova: Peter Zavitz

Prince Edward Island
Cardigan: Gertrude Partridge
Egmont: Irene N. Dyment
Hillsborough: Dolores Crane
Malpeque: Judy Whitaker

New Brunswick
Beauséjour: Lyman Dean
Carleton—Charlotte: Ben Kilfoil
Fredericton: Allan Sharp
Fundy—Royal: Rosemarie M. McNairn
Gloucester: Serge Robichaud
Madawaska—Victoria: Réal Couturier
Miramichi: Frank Clancy
Moncton: Terry Boudreau
Restigouche: Nancy Quigley
Saint John: Judith Meinert

Quebec
Abitibi: Gerry Lemoyne
Ahuntsic: Vincent Guadagnano
Anjou—Rivière-des-Prairies: Vincent Marchione
Marchione' was a forty-nine-year-old educator and social worker in 1988. He focused his campaign on job creation, and won support in his multicultural riding with a nomination speech delivered in French, Italian, Creole, and English. Marchione later ran for a school board seat and led an environmental group that opposed the construction of petrochemical plants in east-end Montreal.
Argenteuil—Papineau: André Marc Paré
Beauce: Danielle Wolfe
Beauharnois—Salaberry: Daniel Payette
Bellechasse: Gilles Papillon
Berthier—Montcalm: Pierre Arès
Blainville—Deux-Montagnes: Louisette Tremblay-Hinton
Bonaventure—Îles-de-la-Madeleine: Germaine Poirier
Bourassa: Kéder Hyppolite
Brome—Missisquoi: Paul Vachon
Chambly: Phil Edmonston
Champlain: Jocelyn Crête
Charlesbourg: Denis Courteau
Charlevoix: Kenneth Choquette
Châteauguay: Pierre Hétu
Chicoutimi: Mustapha Elayoubi
Drummond: Ferdinand Berner
Duvernay: Michel Agnaieff
Frontenac: Claude L'Heureux
Gaspé: Bertrand Réhel
Gatineau—La Lièvre: Marius Tremblay
Hochelaga—Maisonneuve: Gaétan Nadeau
Hull—Aylmer: Danielle Lapointe-Vienneau
Joliette: Claude Hétu
Jonquière: Françoise Gauthier
Kamouraska—Rivière-du-Loup: Maurice Tremblay
La Prairie: Bruce Katz
Lachine—Lac-Saint-Louis: Val Udvarhely
Lac-Saint-Jean: Jean Paradis
Langelier: Pauline Gingras
LaSalle—Émard: Jean-Claude Bohrer
Laurentides: Bill Clay
Laurier—Sainte-Marie: François Beaulne
Laval: Paul Cappon
Laval-des-Rapides: John Shatilla
Lévis: Jean-Paul Harney
Longueuil: Daniel Senez
Lotbinière: Richard Lacoursière
Louis-Hébert: Pierre Lavigne
Manicouagan: Carol Guay
Matapédia—Matane: Yves Coté
Mégantic—Compton—Stanstead: Jean-Pierre Walsh
Mercier: André Cordeau
Montmorency—Orléans: Éric Gourdeau
Mount Royal: Tariq Alvi
Notre-Dame-de-Grâce: Maria Peluso
Outremont: Louise O'Neill
Papineau—Saint-Michel: Giovanni Adamo
Adamo was an executive chef with longstanding ties to his riding's Italian community. He received 5,948 votes (15.10%), finishing third against Liberal incumbent André Ouellet.
Pierrefonds—Dollard: Pierre Razik
Pontiac—Gatineau—Labelle: John Trent
Portneuf: Jean-Marie Fiset
Québec-Est: Jeanne Lalanne
Richelieu: Gaston Dupuis
Dupuis, an office clerk, ran as a New Democratic Party candidate in two elections. He ran his 1988 campaign from his work space and acknowledged that his party did not have a strong historical support base in Richelieu.
Richmond—Wolfe: Marc-André Péloquin
Rimouski—Témiscouata: Pierre Boisjoli
Roberval: Réjean Lalancette
Rosemont: Giuseppe Sciortino
Saint-Denis: Jaime Llambias-Wolff
Saint-Henri—Westmount: Ruth Rose
Saint-Hubert: Nicole Desranleau
Saint-Hyacinthe—Bagot: Hélène Lortie-Narayana
Saint-Jean: Rezeq Faraj
Saint-Laurent: Sid Ingerman
Saint-Léonard: Michel Roche
Saint-Maurice: Claude Rompré
Shefford: Paul Pearson
Sherbrooke: Alain Poirier
Témiscamingue: Rémy Trudel
Terrebonne: Lauraine Vaillancourt
Trois-Rivières: Josée Trudel
Vaudreuil: Suzanne Aubertin
Verchères: Maria Jean
Verdun—Saint-Paul: Alain Tassé

Ontario
Algoma: Lloyd Greenspoon
Beaches—Woodbine: Neil Young
Brampton: John Morris
Brampton—Malton: Paul Ledgister
Brant: Derek Blackburn
Broadview—Greenwood: Lynn McDonald
Bruce—Grey: Cathy Hird
Burlington: Jane Mulkewich
Cambridge: Bruce Davidson
Carleton—Gloucester: Robert Cottingham
Cochrane—Superior: Len Wood
Davenport: Anna Menozzi
Don Valley East: Brant Loper
Don Valley North: Anton Kuerti
Don Valley West: Ian Cameron
Durham: Margaret Wilbur
Eglinton—Lawrence: Vittoria Levi
Levi was born in Italy.  She was a vocational rehabilitation counseller and served as a representative of the National Congress for Italian Canadians in the 1980s.  Early in 1988, she criticized Robert Elgie's proposals for provincial labour law reform as "a change for the worse" with respect to the rights of injured workers.  She was forty-nine years old at the time of the election.  She received 6,241 votes (15.57%), finishing third against Liberal candidate Joe Volpe.
Elgin: Bob Habkirk
Erie: Sean O'Flynn
Essex—Kent: John Coggans
Essex—Windsor: Steven W. Langdon
Etobicoke Centre: Phil Jones
Etobicoke North: Ted Humphreys
Etobicoke—Lakeshore: Judy Brandow
Glengarry—Prescott—Russell: Helena McCuaig
Guelph—Wellington: Alex Michalos
Haldimand—Norfolk: Eric Butt
Halton—Peel: Fern Wolf
Hamilton East: Dave Wilson
Hamilton Mountain: Marion Dewar
Hamilton West: Lesley Russell
Hamilton—Wentworth: Julia McCrea
Hastings—Frontenac—Lennox and Addington: Bud Acton
Huron—Bruce: Tony McQuail
Kenora—Rainy River: John Edmund Parry
Kent: Leo Rustin
Kingston and the Islands: Len Johnson
Major-General Leonard V. Johnson is from a military background.  He joined the Royal Canadian Air Force in 1950, rose to the rank of major-general and served as Commandant of the National Defence College. He retired from the service in 1984. He represented the New Democratic Party in a national debate on defence issues in 1988 (Kingston Whig-Standard, 31 October 1988), and was the only candidate in Kingston and the Islands to argue that Canada should be made a Nuclear-Weapon-Free Zone (KWS, 11 November 1988).  He also called for Canadian soldiers to be returned from Europe, arguing that large expenditures on overseas troops were hindering Canada's ability to run a modern navy (KWS, 11 November 1988). Johnson was considered a star candidate, and was backed by a strong local organization that outspent all other campaigns in the city (KWS, 25 May 1989).  His support base was eroded by a strong Liberal campaign, however, and he finished third against Liberal Peter Milliken with 11,442 votes (20.10%). Following the election, Johnson was named Kingston chair of the peace group Project Plowshares (KWS, 21 December 1988).
Kitchener: Sue Coulter
Lambton—Middlesex: Larry Ross Green
Lanark—Carleton: Bill Cox
Leeds—Grenville: Barry Grills
Lincoln: John Mayer
London East: Marion Boyd
London West: Bruce Lundgren
London—Middlesex: Michael Wyatt
Markham: Susan Krone
Mississauga East: Walter Grozdanovski
Mississauga South: Sue Craig
Mississauga West: Paul Simon
Nepean: Bea Murray
Niagara Falls: Dick Harrington
Nickel Belt: John Rodriguez
Nipissing: Dawson Pratt
Northumberland: Gord Barnes
Oakville—Milton: Richard J. Banigan
Ontario: Jim Wiseman
Oshawa: Ed Broadbent
Ottawa Centre: Mike Cassidy
Ottawa South: John Fryer
Ottawa West: Theresa Kavanagh
Ottawa—Vanier: Kathryn Barnard
Oxford: Brian Donlevy
Parkdale—High Park: Abby Pollonetsky
Parry Sound—Muskoka: Joanne Malchuk
Perth—Wellington—Waterloo: Linda Ham
Peterborough: Gillian Sandeman
Prince Edward—Hastings: Don Wilson
Renfrew: Elizabeth Ives-Ruyter
Rosedale: Doug Wilson
Sarnia—Lambton: Julie Foley
Sault Ste. Marie: Steve Butland
Scarborough Centre: Garth C. Dee
Scarborough East: Mary Cook
Scarborough West: Dave Gracey
Scarborough—Agincourt: Susie Vallance
Scarborough—Rouge River: Raymond Cho
Scarborough Centre: Judy Watson
Simcoe North: Mike McMurter
St. Catharines: Rob West
St. Paul's: Diane Bull
Stormont—Dundas: Steve J. Corrie
Sudbury: Bill Major
Major is a retired United Church minister.  He joined the New Democratic Party in 1962 after hearing Tommy Douglas speak in Hamilton.  He was ordained as a minister in 1969, moved to Sudbury in 1978, and served for nine years as coordinator for the Pastoral Institute of Northeastern Ontario. Major sought the provincial New Democratic Party nomination for Sudbury East in 1987, but lost to Shelley Martel.  He subsequently spoke against the Canada-United States Free Trade Agreement, arguing that it allow Northern Ontario to become a source of income for giant American manufacturers.  He ran a strong campaign, but ultimately finished second against Liberal candidate Diane Marleau with 11,811 votes (27.77%).
Thunder Bay—Atikokan: Iain Angus
Thunder Bay—Nipigon: Ernie Epp
Timiskaming: Earl Evans
Timmins—Chapleau: Cid Samson
Trinity—Spadina: Dan Heap
Victoria—Haliburton: Cathy Vainio
Waterloo: Scott Piatkowski
Welland—St. Catharines—Thorold: Ken Lee
Wellington—Grey—Dufferin—Simcoe: Shirley Farlinger
Willowdale: Abbe Adelson
Windsor West: Paul Forder
Windsor—Lake St. Clair: Howard McCurdy
York Centre: Cathy Mele
York North: Evelyn Buck
York South—Weston: Steve Krashinsky
York West: Alice Lambrinos
York—Simcoe: Judy Darcy

Manitoba
Brandon—Souris: Dave Serle
Churchill: Rod Murphy
Dauphin—Swan River: Eric Irwin
Lisgar—Marquette: Fred Tait
Portage—Interlake: Gerry Follows
Provencher: Mary Sabovitch
Selkirk: Howard Pawley
St. Boniface: Alan Turner
Winnipeg North: David Orlikow
Winnipeg North Centre: Cyril Keeper
Winnipeg South: Len Van Roon
Winnipeg South Centre: Les Campbell
Winnipeg Transcona: Bill Blaikie
Winnipeg—St. James: Len Sawatsky

Saskatchewan
Kindersley—Lloydminster: Grant Whitmore
Mackenzie: Vic Althouse
Moose Jaw—Lake Centre: Rod Laporte
Prince Albert—Churchill River: Ray Funk
Regina—Lumsden: Les Benjamin
Regina—Qu'Appelle: Simon de Jong
Regina—Wascana: Dickson Bailey
Saskatoon—Clark's Crossing: Chris Axworthy
Saskatoon—Dundurn: Ron Fisher
Saskatoon—Humboldt: Stan Hovdebo
Souris—Moose Mountain: Jeff Sample
Swift Current—Maple Creek—Assiniboia: Laura Balas
The Battlefords—Meadow Lake: Len Taylor
Yorkton—Melville: Lorne Nystrom

References